Edward Larned McGehee III (April 9, 1907 – March 3, 1989) was an American football and baseball coach and college athletics administrator.  He was the sixth head football coach at the Southeastern Louisiana University and held that position for five seasons, from 1946 until 1950.  His coaching record at Southeastern Louisiana was 25–20–3.  McGehee was also the head baseball coach at Southeastern Louisiana for one season, in 1949, tallying a mark of 7–11.  He was the school's athletic director from 1946 to 1971.

McGehee died on March 3, 1989, at his home in Hammond, Louisiana . A road on the Southeastern Louisiana University campus was dedicated in his honour in 2012.

References

External links
 

1907 births
1989 deaths
Southeastern Louisiana Lions and Lady Lions athletic directors
Southeastern Louisiana Lions baseball coaches
Southeastern Louisiana Lions football coaches
Sportspeople from Hammond, Louisiana